Clarkco State Park is a state park in the U.S. state of Mississippi located off Mississippi Highway 145 (old U.S. Highway 45) approximately  north of Quitman.

Activities and amenities
The park features boating, waterskiing and fishing on a  lake, 58 campsites, 20 camper cabins and a cottage, visitors center, 9-hole disc golf course, picnic area, and a  nature trail.

References

External links
 
 Friends of Clarkco State Park Facebook Page

State parks of Mississippi
Protected areas of Clarke County, Mississippi